Andrew Lindsey Mason (born 22 September 1943) is an English former first-class cricketer.

Mason was born at Birmingham in September 1943. He later studied at Brasenose College at the University of Oxford. While studying at Oxford, he played first-class cricket for Oxford University, making his debut against Lancashire at Oxford in 1963. He played first-class cricket for Oxford until 1965, making a total of fifteen appearances. Playing as a wicket-keeper, he scored a total of 213 runs in his fifteen matches at an average of 11.21 and with a high score of 47, while behind the stumps he took 12 catches and made five stumpings.

References

External links

1943 births
Living people
Cricketers from Birmingham, West Midlands
Alumni of Brasenose College, Oxford
English cricketers
Oxford University cricketers